Newton is a suburb in the north-east of Chester, in the unitary authority of Cheshire West and Chester and the ceremonial county of  Cheshire, England. Including the locale of Plas Newton, the area is contiguous with Upton to the north and Hoole to the south. The electoral ward involved had a population taken at the 2011 census was 9,556.

Newton is made up of some privately owned residential properties, but mainly comprises a large council estate now co-owned with Cheshire West and Chester Council and run by Chester and District Housing Trust (C&DHT).

Education
Local schools in the area include Newton Primary School and, in the independent sector, The Firs School.

Politics and Governance

British Parliament
Newton is in the City of Chester parliamentary constituency and is represented by Samantha Dixon MP.

See also
 St Columba's Church, Chester

References

Areas of Chester